Evelyn Clark Colfax (1823 in Argyle, Washington County, New York – July 10, 1863 in Newport, Rhode Island) was the first wife of Schuyler Colfax, an American politician who later became Speaker of the House of Representatives and Vice President of the United States serving as the first vice president of Ulysses S. Grant.

She was the daughter of Col. Ralph Clark and the granddaughter of Ebenezer Clark, who was elected to the 1st New York State Legislature and then the 2nd, 12th, 13th, 15th, and 20-25th state legislatures.

On October 10, 1844, Evelyn married her childhood friend Schuyler Colfax at her family home in Argyle, which was officiated by the Rev. Joel Wood.  They then moved to South Bend, Indiana. Schuyler and Evelyn had no children during the marriage and for several years before her death, she suffered from poor health.

She was buried at City Cemetery in South Bend, Indiana near her husband Schuyler. The inscription on her grave reads, "The path of the just shineth more and more unto the perfect day."

References

1823 births
1863 deaths
19th-century American women
People from Argyle, New York
Colfax family